Diplodocinae is an extinct subfamily of diplodocid sauropods that existed from the Late Jurassic to Early Cretaceous of North America, Europe, Africa and South America, about 161.2 to 136.4 million years ago. Genera within the subfamily include Tornieria, Supersaurus, Leinkupal, Galeamopus, Diplodocus, and Barosaurus.

Cladogram of the Diplodocidae after Tschopp, Mateus, and Benson (2015).

References

Diplodocids
Jurassic dinosaurs